Lincoln International Academy is located in Mnagua, Nicaragua. It is a Catholic private school. This school that was founded in 1995. It is one of the few schools in Nicaragua that offer bilingual education (Spanish-English). LIA is accredited by the Southern Association of Colleges and Schools since February 2009. LIA is also a member of the National Catholic Educational Association, the Association of American Schools in Central America, and hosts the Masters in Education Program by Framingham State University.

History
Founded in Managua in 1991 and later moved to  a  campus, the new campus was built with the construction building code of California, USA, and has a highly advanced security system.  The Nicaraguan Ministry of Education accredited Lincoln International Academy in 1995 .

Sports
Basketball
Cross Country
Gymnastics
Soccer
Swimming
Track & Field
Volleyball

Extracurricular Activities
HACIA Democracy
Knowledge Bowl
Model United Nations
Mu Alpha Theta
National Honor Society
Student Council

See also
List of schools in Nicaragua
Education in Nicaragua
List of universities in Nicaragua

References

External links

Education in Nicaragua
International schools in Nicaragua
Bilingual schools
Educational institutions established in 1991
1991 establishments in Nicaragua